The 1989–90 season was the 44th season in FK Partizan's existence. This article shows player statistics and matches that the club played during the 1989–90 season.

Competitions

Yugoslav First League

Yugoslav Cup

Yugoslav Super Cup

Uhrencup

Cup Winners' Cup

First round

Second round

Quarter-finals

See also
 List of FK Partizan seasons

References

External links
 Official website
 Partizanopedia 1989-90  (in Serbian)

FK Partizan seasons
Partizan